The Falls River, New Zealand is a river in the Tasman District of New Zealand. It arises in the Pikikirunga Range near Mount Evans and flows north-east and then east through the Abel Tasman National Park into Tasman Bay / Te Tai-o-Aorere at Sandfly Bay. The river is named because it falls more than 1000 metres in 10 km.

See also
List of rivers of New Zealand

References

Rivers of the Tasman District
Rivers of New Zealand